Peter Spirer, founder of Rugged Entertainment, is an Academy and Emmy Award-Nominated director and producer whose films have been official selections at Sundance Film Festival.

Peter has directed over 20 feature films with worldwide distribution on multiple platforms including Rhyme & Reason, BEEF, Tupac Shakur: Thug Angel and Notorious B.I.G: Bigger Than Me.  His latest films are The Legend of 420 which explores the legalization of cannabis; Spirit Game: Pride of a Nation an insider's look into the Iroquois Nationals lacrosse team - with the first-ever international championship held on sovereign land; and Sacheen, about Native American activist Sacheen Littlefeather's life and that fateful night at the 1973 Oscars.  

Currently in production is Sign O’ The Times — a documentary about the legendary rock ‘n’ roll billboards of the Sunset Strip in their heyday from the 1960s-80s as told by artists, managers, record company executives, art directors, and photographers.

Films and Productions
In 1993, Spirer's short documentary Blood Ties: The Life and Work of Sally Mann was nominated for an Academy Award.

Spirer's documentary Rhyme and Reason(1997) made Rolling Stone's 40 Greatest Rock Documentaries list.

In 2003 he was the winner of the Jury Award for the Ojai Film Festival for his debut narrative feature film Dunsmore.

Spirer has produced a number of musician-focused documentary films, including Rhyme and Reason, Beef I-III, Tupac: Thug Angel, and Notorious B.I.G.: Bigger Than Life. Many of his films play regularly on cable television networks. His films, Kiss and Tail: The Hollywood Jump Off, and Black and Blue: Legends of the Hip-Hop Cop, were in rotation on Showtime.'Spirer's films have twice been screened at the  Sundance Film Festival.

In 2009 he produced and directed the feature film Just Another Day, starring Wood Harris and Jamie Hector (both from HBO's The Wire), which was distributed by Image Entertainment.Smash (2009 and rereleased in 2020) gives a look inside a biannual school bus race in Florida, a harrowing event where carnage and collisions are most definitely encouraged.Rhyme and Punishment (2011) takes an in-depth look at the role of prison in hip-hop culture and reveals the side of the story that is not being covered by the news and popular media.  Featuring intimate and compelling interviews with convicted rappers Beanie Sigel, Prodigy, Cassidy, Project Pat, Immortal Technique, Slick Rick, and many more. These artists who were at the top of their game when they got locked up explain the details of the crimes that led to their arrests, and document their struggles to deal with the shocking brutality of incarcerated life.Soulja Boy: The Movie (2011) follows the young and charismatic yet polarizing entrepreneur who offers an all-access glimpse into his life, his music, and his fascinating career.

In 2016, Spirer was the executive producer of the film Queen Mimi. The documentary looks into the life of Mimi, an unhoused woman who went from living in a laundromat to walking down the red carpet with Zach Galifianakis.

First premiering on STARZ, Spirit Game: Pride of the Nation (2017)  offers an insider's look into the Iroquois Nationals lacrosse team; the first-ever international lacrosse championship held on sovereign land. Spirer produced the film which won Best Documentary at the Red Nation Film Festival.The Legend of 420  (2017) Explores the controversial use of marijuana and the evolution of mainstream society, from a dangerous narcotic listed as a Schedule 1 Drug substance since the 1970s, to the rush to decriminalize it today. What has changed and why? What will the cannabis industry look like in five years? Will it retain its integrity as a homegrown industry or be co-opted by Big Business? Experts, growers, celebrities, and politicians weigh in on the future of Canna-business.Michael Des Barres: Who do you want me to be? (2020) Spirer is an Executive Producer. The doc focuses on the son of a junkie aristocrat and a schizophrenic showgirl who becomes the master of reinvention on a 50+ year journey through rock and roll, TV, and film.

The documentary Sacheen'' (2021) which Spirer directed and produced is a short documentary film that offers Sacheen Littlefeather, a 71-year-old White Mountain Apache and Yaqui elder, actress, activist, dancer, educator, and writer, living in Northern California, the opportunity to share her own story, in her own words. As we revisit one of the most memorable and controversial moments in the history of the Academy Awards, Sacheen’s voice will finally be joined together with today’s brave women, who are determined to make their voices heard around the world.

This documentary won two awards: Best Documentary Short at the American Indian Film Festival and the Audience Choice Award for Documentary at the Beverly Hills Film Festival.

References 

Year of birth missing (living people)
Living people